Ayakudi is a panchayat town in Dindigul district in the state of Tamil Nadu, India. Ayakudi is thought to be the place where the kings of Ay Kingdom originated. The city is known for guava. It is filled with nature in the slopes of Kodaikanal.

Ayakudi originally means Ayar (shepherd) kudi (dwelling place).

Demographics
 India census, Ayakudi had a population of 23,410. Males constitute 50% of the population and females 50%. Ayakudi has an average literacy rate of 61%, higher than the national average of 59.5%; with 59% of the males and 41% of females literate. 10% of the population is under 5 years of age.

This place is (3.0 km) from Palani, and its Lord Muruga Temple. The hill station called Kodaikanal is about 60 km from Ayakudi. A pond divides the city into Old Ayakudi (east of the pond) and New Ayakudi (west) and Obulapuram.

People and livelihood
Different communities inhabit in Ayakudi. There are streets where only a particular community or caste reside.

Most of the people participate in agriculture. Believed that rate of literacy went up to 70% by over nine years now. Most women are in teaching careers, working with nearby villages around Dindugul district.

Ayakudi is known for its guava cultivation and fruit market. From this market, guava is shipped to elsewhere in India and abroad. Apart from guava, lime, paddy, mango, sugarcane and cotton are also cultivated in Ayakudi.

Ayakudi is a town panchayath now, which was under a landlord (Jamindar). Many landlords still live with their historical culture.

Education
There are Government primary schools and private primary schools are available inside the village. Ayakudi Jamindar founded a Higher Secondary School named I T O (Immudipatam Thirunyanasamanth Obala Kondamma Naiyakan) Higher Secondary School, is a major source of education.

Swamy Matric Higher Secondary School is in Thattankulam, Palani.

Vivekanada Vidhyalaa is a matriculation school in Ayakudi.  Its students get high scores in 10th and 12th standards.

Apart from this school, in Palani there are Akshaya academy, Devi matriculation school, Government Girls and Boys Schools, and St. Paul's matriculation school.

Arulmigu Palani Andavar Arts and Science College, APA college for Ladies, APA polytechnic, Subramianaia Engineering college are near Ayakudi.

Notable people
Dr. K.A. Narayanasamy Maniyakarar, Madurai Jilla Ex-General Secretary Indian National Congress, Pradesh Congress Committee ex member (PCC),  Ayakudi Town Panchayat ex Vice-President, Society ex Vice-President, Area Committee ex Member (Endowments Board), a politician and close aide to TN Ex CM K.Kamaraj, Ex CM M.Bhaktavatsalam, Ex Governor P.Ramachandran, Ex Minister P.Kakkan.. and all other Congress politicians 

Dr. Palani Baba, a politician and close aide to TN Ex CM MGR, Karunanidhi, PM Indira Gandhi.

References

Cities and towns in Dindigul district